This is a list of cities and towns in Oman.

Adam
As Sib
Al Ashkharah
Al Buraimi
Al Hamra
Al Jazer
Al Madina A'Zarqa, formerly known as Blue City
Al Suwaiq
Bahla
Barka
Bidbid
Bidiya
Duqm
Haima
Ibra
Ibri
Izki
Jabrin
Jalan Bani Bu Hassan
Khasab
Mahooth
Manah
Masirah
Matrah
Mudhaybi
Mudhaireb
Muscat
Nizwa
Quriyat
Raysut
Rustaq
Ruwi
Saham
Shinas
Saiq
Salalah
Samail
Sohar
Sur
Tan`am
Thumrait

See also

 Governorates of Oman
 Provinces of Oman
 

 
Cities